The 2017 Orienteering World Cup was the 23rd edition of the Orienteering World Cup. The 2017 Orienteering World Cup consisted of 10 individual events, four relays and three sprint relay events. The events were located in Finland, Estonia, Latvia and Switzerland. The 2017 World Orienteering Championships in Tartu, Estonia are included in the World Cup.

Matthias Kyburz of Switzerland won his second consecutive overall title in the men's World Cup, his fourth title in total. Tove Alexandersson of Sweden won her fourth consecutive overall title in the women's World Cup.

Events

Men

Women

Points distribution
The 40 best runners in each event are awarded points. The winner is awarded 100 points. In WC events 1 to 8, the seven best results counts in the overall classification. In the finals (WC 9 and WC 10), both results counts.

Overall standings
This section shows the final standings after all 10 individual events.

Relay
The table shows the final standings after all 7 relay events. The six best results counts in the overall standings, which means that each team's worst results (in brackets) does not count.

Achievements
Only individual competitions.

External links
 World Cup Ranking - IOF

References

Orienteering World Cup seasons
Orienteering competitions
2017 in orienteering